XET may refer to:

 XET-AM 990 in Monterrey, Nuevo León, now owned by Grupo Multimedios Estrella de Oro and known as "La T Grande"
 XET-FM 94.1 in Monterrey, Nuevo León
 XET-TDT (channel 31, virtual 6) in Monterrey, Nuevo León, now owned by Televisa
 Xyloglucan endo-transglycosylase, an enzyme involved in plant cell wall structure